Bhumiband is an independent Singaporean Malay band. The band's lineup has remained static during its history, with the only exceptions of the departure of guitarist and co-songwriter Nazri, Ard and Kif in 2005. Hang Dimas would later join the band Hujan in 2008. Awi Rafael also has a successful solo career after Bhumiband. Irfan and Reamie both become official members in 2016.

History
In 2005, Bhumiband achieved regional recognition with their first album Suara Dunia. The album was nominated for 5 awards, including 2 regional categories in the 2005 Anugerah Planet Muzik (APM), which is the local Malay music industry's awards show. It also featured a Batucada track from Wicked Aura Singapore. The band's second album, Konspirasi Dunia was equally if not more successful in 2006. The song "Goda" from the album was featured in the original soundtrack of Malaysian action film, Remp-It.

After touring together with Indonesian band Sheila on 7 and recording non-stop in the late 2006, the band went on hiatus following individual commitment and projects.

Return
In late 2016, the band returned with the single "Hanya Kamu". Bhumiband has been known to use pop and rock in their style of music which was predominant in their 2005 and 2006 albums but "Hanya Kamu" displayed the band's progression and evolution with a wider arrangement akin to its current form. "Hanya Kamu" was nominated in the "Popular Song (Singapore)" category and the band was also nominated in the "Popular Artist (Singapore)" category at the annual .

The band released their 2nd single in January 2018 titled "Gerbang Asmara Hakiki". The single debuts the band's first collaboration with local writer and prolific wordsmith, Mohd Khair Mohd Yasin.

In 2019, Bhumiband collaborated with Indah Han and produced her 1st Malay single "Kehadiranmu" (composed by Kief). The band then followed up with a duet with Indah in 2020 on the song "Ku Ingin Tahu" which was originally composed by Atiqah. Just before the Covid lockdown, Bhumiband managed to complete a recording session with Juwiezy and produced "Segalanya Kerana" (composed by Reamie).

During the pandemic, Bhumiband worked on their 3rd Album "The Bhumi Projek" and released "Kau di Hatiku" as the first single from the album. The song featured Indonesian singers "Zara & Doddy" and managed to climb Singapore's Malay local radio charts "Ria897 Carta Singa Maksima".

The band is planning to collaborate with more local and regional vocalists. They have released "Oh Kekasih" (single) featuring local ballad singer "Zaibaktian" on the last day of 2021 and "Imaginasi Ku" featuring Malaysian singer/songwriter "Airinna Namara" on 31 March 2022. "Imaginasi Ku" also managed to get into "Ria897 Carta Singa Maksima" 2 months after it was released. The band released "Adinda" on 5th August 2022 and will be releasing "Biru Lagi" on 25th November 2022. The band work with one of the most well known producer, Ashidy Ridwan for "Biru Lagi" which feature vocals from Indah, Flique and Zaibaktian.

To date, Bhumiband has released 3 studio albums, 9 singles and currently working on the next project with Awi Rafael. Having sold thousands of records regionally in Singapore, Malaysia, and Indonesia, Bhumiband is one of the most well-known Singapore Malay bands.

Members

Current members
 Ard - Vocalist
 Irfan - Guitarist
 Reamie - Guitarist
 Kif - Bassist
 Zuher - Drummer
 Atiqah - Keyboards

Former Members
 Awi Rafael - Vocalist
 Hang Dimas - Keyboards
 Athif - Guitarist
 Eddy - Percussionist / Bassist
 Nazri - Guitarist

Accolades
Anugerah Planet Muzik 2005
 Best Local Song - "Oh Kasih"
 Best Local Album - Suara Dunia
 Best New Group/Duo - Bhumiband

 
 Best Song (Singapore) - "Goda"
 Best Album (Singapore) - Konspirasi Dunia
 Best Artist (Singapore) - Bhumiband

Anugerah Planet Muzik 2018
 Nominated for Popular Artist (Singapore)  - Bhumiband
 Nominated for Popular Song (Singapore)  - "Hanya Kamu"

Ria897 Carta Singa Maksima
 "Imaginasi Ku" - Reached No.3 (25 Jun 2022)
 "Kau di Hatiku" - Reached No.1 (29 Jan 2022) for 2 weeks 
 "Hanya Kamu" - Reached No.1 (21 Oct 2017) for 3 weeks

Discography

References

External links
MusicSG - digital archive of Singapore music
SOFT - It's Music in Singapore
PERKAMUS - Society of Singers, Musicians and Professionals of the Malay Industry in Singapore

Musical groups established in 2003
Singaporean musical groups